Simon Phillips (born 20 June 1983) is an Australian former professional rugby league footballer who played for the North Queensland Cowboys in the National Rugby League and Coventry Bears in the League 1.

Playing career
A Souths Mackay junior, Phillips joined the North Queensland Cowboys as a teenager. In 2001 and 2002, he represented Queensland under-19, starting on the wing in both games.

In Round 12 of the 2002 NRL season, Phillips made his NRL debut as an 18-year old in the Cowboys' 40–32 win over the St George Illawarra Dragons. A week later, he scored his first NRL try in the Cowboys' 6–34 loss to the New Zealand Warriors. He ended his debut season with one try from four games.

In 2003, Phillips broke his ankle while playing for the North Queensland Young Guns in the Queensland Cup. He was released by the club at the end of the season.

In 2004, he joined the Wynnum Manly Seagulls and spent six years at the club. During that time he played over 100 games for the club, was selected for the Queensland Residents in 2006 and was named their Player of the Year in 2007. He retired at the end of the 2009 season but returned three years later, joining the Norths Devils.

In December 2014, Phillips signed with the Coventry Bears for their first professional season in League 1. In February 2015, he was named captain of the side for 2015 season. He retired at the end of the 2015 season.

Statistics

NRL
 Statistics are correct to the end of the 2002 season

League 1

References

1983 births
Living people
Australian rugby league players
Coventry Bears players
Norths Devils players
North Queensland Cowboys players
Rugby league wingers
Rugby league centres
Rugby league players from Brisbane
Wynnum Manly Seagulls players